The Indiana Invaders was an American soccer team based in South Bend, Indiana, United States. Founded in 1998, the team played in the USL Premier Development League (PDL), the fourth tier of the American Soccer Pyramid, in the Great Lakes Division of the Central Conference.

The team played its home games at the soccer-specific Indiana Invaders Soccer Complex since 2003. The team's colors were blue, gold and black.

The team was part of the larger Invaders FC soccer club, which organizes more than 25 boys and girls youth soccer teams in northern Indiana. The club also fielded a team in the USL's Super-20 League, a league for players 17 to 20 years of age run under the United Soccer Leagues umbrella.

Players

Notable former players
This list of notable former players comprises players who went on to play professional soccer after playing for the team in the Premier Development League, or those who previously played professionally before joining the team.

  Clint Dempsey
  Brent Brockman
  Conner Cappelletti
  Mubarike Chisoni
  Bright Dike
  Shaun Francis
  Kevin Goldthwaite
  Brad Knighton
  Nathan Micklos
  Steven Perry
  Brian Plotkin
  Alec Purdie
  Jeff Rowland
  Kwame Sarkodie
  Minori Sato
  Jack Stewart
  Ryan Stewart
  Hideaki Takeda
  Michael Tanke
  Phil Tuttle
  Lance Watson

Year-by-year

Head coach
  Mario Manta (2003–2011)

Stadium
 Indiana Invaders Sports Complex; South Bend, Indiana (2003–Present)

Average attendance
Attendance stats are calculated by averaging each team's self-reported home attendances from the historical match archive at https://web.archive.org/web/20100105175057/http://www.uslsoccer.com/history/index_E.html

 2005: 443
 2006: 499
 2007: 336
 2008: 282
 2009: 583
 2010: 488

References

External links
Official website
Official PDL site

Association football clubs established in 1998
USL League Two teams
Sports in South Bend, Indiana
Soccer clubs in Indiana
USISL teams
1998 establishments in Indiana
Association football clubs disestablished in 2011
2011 disestablishments in Indiana